Breach of Promise is a 1942 British romance film directed by Harold Huth and starring Clive Brook, Judy Campbell, C.V. France, Marguerite Allan and Percy Walsh. A playwright meets a young woman and she soon files a fake breach of promise action against him, hoping to receive a blackmail payment. Instead he decides to marry her to teach her a lesson.

Cast
 Clive Brook – Peter Conroy
 Judy Campbell – Pamela Lawrence
 C. V. France – Morgan
 Marguerite Allan – Pamela Rose
 Percy Walsh – Saxon Rose
 Dennis Arundell – Phillip
 George Merritt – Professor Beaver
 David Horne – Sir Hamar
 Charles Victor – Sir William
 Aubrey Mallalieu – Judge

References

External links
Breach of Promise at IMDB

1942 films
1940s romance films
British romance films
Films directed by Harold Huth
Films set in London
British black-and-white films
1940s English-language films
1940s British films
English-language romance films